Bruno Mendes may refer to:

Bruno Mendes (footballer, born 1976), Portuguese central defender
Bruno Mendes (footballer, born 1994), Brazilian striker

See also
Bruno Méndez (disambiguation)